Henderson is a town in St. Martin Parish, Louisiana, United States. Part of the Lafayette metropolitan area, its population was 1,617 at the 2020 U.S. census. Home to Cajun Palms RV Resort, it was rated in 2017 as the best campsite in Louisiana in a 50-state survey conducted by Msn.com.

Traffic fines
The town collects 89% of its general revenue through traffic fines.

Geography

Demographics

As of the 2020 United States census, there were 1,617 people, 628 households, and 489 families residing in the town. In 2000, the median income for a household in the town was $21,295, and the median income for a family was $22,891. Males had a median income of $24,265 versus $17,583 for females. The per capita income for the town was $13,907. About 24.2% of families and 29.5% of the population were below the poverty line, including 44.7% of those under age 18 and 25.6% of those age 65 or over. At the 2019 American Community Survey, the median income for a household was $52,391 and the mean income was $32,973.

Henderson relies particularly heavily on fines and forfeits to pay for basic services. In 2013, Henderson collected $3.73 in fines and forfeits for every $1 it collected in taxes.

Education
Public schools in St. Martin Parish are operated by the St. Martin Parish School Board.

References

Towns in St. Martin Parish, Louisiana
Towns in Louisiana
Towns in Lafayette metropolitan area, Louisiana
Acadiana